

History

Russian Empire
In 1858, Ingushetia was conquered by Imperial Russia, and in 1859 the historical Chechnya was annexed to Russia as well, during the long Caucasian war of 1817–64.

Soviet period
After the Russian Revolution of 1917, on January 20, 1921, Chechnya and Ingushetia joined the Mountain Autonomous Soviet Socialist Republic. Partition of the Mountain ASSR began shortly after it was formed, and its Chechen District was separated on November 30, 1922 as Chechen Autonomous Oblast. On July 7, 1924, the remains of the Mountain ASSR were split into North Ossetian Autonomous Oblast and Ingush Autonomous Oblast. On January 15, 1934, Chechen and Ingush Autonomous Oblasts were joined into Checheno-Ingush Autonomous Oblast, which was elevated in status to that of an ASSR (Checheno-Ingush ASSR) on December 5, 1936.

World War II
During World War II, in 1942–43, the republic was partly occupied by Nazi Germany while 40,000 Chechens fought in the Red Army. On March 7, 1944, on the orders of Joseph Stalin, the republic was disbanded and its population forcibly deported upon the accusations of collaboration with the Axis powers and separatism. The territory of the ASSR was divided between Stavropol Krai (where Grozny Oblast was formed), the Dagestan ASSR, the North Ossetian ASSR, and the Georgian SSR where the extra territory was known as the Akhalkhevi District until 1957.

Post-war period
On January 9, 1957, Khruschev implemented a policy which allowed people to come back and the republic was restored.

The collapse of Checheno-Ingushetia

On November 27, 1990, the Supreme Soviet of the Chechen-Ingush Autonomous Soviet Socialist Republic adopted a declaration on the state sovereignty of the Chechen-Ingush Republic, and on May 24, 1991, according to the amendments to Art. 71 of the Constitution of the RSFSR, the autonomous republic began to be called the Chechen-Ingush SSR. This decision before the collapse of the USSR (December 1991) was not consistent with Art. 85 of the Constitution of the USSR, which retained the name of the Chechen-Ingush ASSR.

On June 8, 1991, at the initiative of Dzhokhar Dudayev, a part of the delegates of the First Chechen National Congress gathered in Grozny, which proclaimed itself the All-National Congress of the Chechen People (OKChN). Following this, was proclaimed the Chechen Republic (Nokhchi-cho), and the leaders of the Supreme Soviet of the republic were declared "usurpers".

The events of August 19–21, 1991 in Moscow became the catalyst for a socio-political explosion in Checheno-Ingushetia. The organizer and leader of the mass movement was the Executive Committee of the OKChN headed by Dzhokhar Dudaev. After the failure of the GKChP, the Executive Committee of the OKChN and organizations of the national-radical wing came forward with a demand for the resignation of the Supreme Soviet of the Chechen-Ingush ASSR and the holding of new elections. On September 1–2, the 3rd session of the OKChN declared the Supreme Soviet of the Autonomous Republic "deposed" and transferred all power in the Chechen part of the republic to the Executive Committee of the OKChN.

September 6, 1991 Dudayev announced the dissolution of the republican power structures. Armed supporters of OKChN occupied the building of the TV center and the House of Radio, took by storm the House of Political Education, where the meeting of the Supreme Council was held. On this day, the Supreme Soviet met in full force, heads of local councils, clergy, and heads of enterprises were invited for consultations. Dudayev and other leaders of the OKChN decided to take the building by storm. More than 40 deputies of the Chechen-Ingush parliament were beaten, and the chairman of the Grozny City Council, Vitaly Kutsenko, was thrown out of the window by the separatists, and then finished off in the hospital. Doku Zavgayev resigned from the post of chairman of the Supreme Council of Chechen-Ingushetia under pressure from protesters.

On September 15, the Chairman of the Supreme Soviet of the RSFSR Ruslan Khasbulatov arrived in Grozny. Under his leadership in the absence of a quorum the last session of the Supreme Soviet of the republic was held, at which the deputies decided to dissolve the parliament. As a result of negotiations between Khasbulatov and the leaders of the Executive Committee of the OKChN as a temporary authority for the period before the elections (scheduled for November 17) the Provisional Supreme Council of the Chechen-Ingush ASSR was formed of 32 deputies, reduced shortly to 13 deputies, then up to 9. Dudaev's ally Khusein Akhmadov was elected chairman of the Provisional Supreme Council of Chechen-Ingushetia. Assistant to Khasbulatov Yuri Cherny became the deputy chairman of the Council.

By the beginning of October 1991, a conflict arose in the Provisional High Council between supporters of the OKChN (4 members, headed by Khusein Akhmadov) and his opponents (5 members, headed by Yuri Cherny). Akhmadov, on behalf of the entire Council, issued a number of laws and decrees that created the legal basis for the activities of the Executive Committee of the OKChN as the supreme authority, on October 1, announced the division of the Chechen-Ingush Republic into an independent Chechen Republic (Nokhchi-cho) and the Ingush Autonomous Republic within the RSFSR.

On October 5, 7 out of 9 members of the Provisional Supreme Council made a decision on the resignation of Akhmedov and on the abolition of illegal acts. On the same day, the National Guard of the Executive Committee of the OKChN seized the building of the House of Trade Unions, in which the Council sat, and also seized the building of the KGB of the Chechen-Ingush ASSR. On October 6, the Executive Committee of the OKChN announced the dissolution of the Provisional Supreme Council "for subversive and provocative activities". The Council did not comply with this decision and the very next day made a decision to resume activity in full force (32 deputies). Lawyer Badruddin Bakhmadov was elected as the new chairman.

On October 8, the Presidium of the Supreme Soviet of the RSFSR declared the Provisional Supreme Soviet to be the only legitimate body of state power on the territory of Checheno-Ingushetia until the election of a new composition of the Supreme Soviet of the republic.

On October 27, 1991, under the control of supporters of the OKChN in the Chechen part of the republic, presidential and parliamentary elections were held for the Chechen Republic (Nokhchi-cho). Dzhokhar Dudayev was elected President of the self-proclaimed republic. The results of the elections were not recognized by the Council of Ministers of Checheno-Ingushetia, heads of enterprises and departments, heads of a number of regions of the autonomous republic. On November 2, 1991, by the Congress of People's Deputies of the RSFSR, these elections were declared illegal. The structures of legitimate power remained for several months after the September coup of Dudayev. Thus, the Ministry of Internal Affairs and the KGB of Checheno-Ingushetia were abolished only by the end of 1991.

On November 7, the President of the RSFSR Boris Yeltsin issued a decree declaring a state of emergency on the territory of Checheno-Ingushetia. However, practical measures to implement it have failed. Two planes with special forces that landed at the airfield in Khankala were blocked by Chechen separatists. Leaders of anti-Dudayev parties and movements went over to the side of Chechen separatists. The Provisional Supreme Council of Checheno-Ingushetia and its militia disintegrated in the first days of the crisis.

On November 8, Chechen guards blocked the buildings of the Ministry of Internal Affairs and the KGB, as well as military camps. Civilians and fuel trucks were used in the blockade. 

On November 11, the Supreme Soviet of the RSFSR refused to approve the decree of President Yeltsin on the introduction of a state of emergency in Checheno-Ingushetia.

November 30 – December 1, 1991 in three Ingush regions of Checheno-Ingushetia – Malgobek, Nazran and Sunzhensky – a referendum was held on the creation of the Ingush Republic within the RSFSR. 75% of the Ingush population took part in the referendum, 90% were in favor.

As a result of the “Chechen revolution,” the Checheno-Ingushetia was de facto divided into the Chechen Republic of Ichkeria and Ingushetia, which remained outside the territorial-administrative division.

On May 16, 1992, according to the amendment to the Constitution of the RSFSR, the de facto disintegrated Chechen-Ingush SSR received the name Chechen-Ingush Republic.

On June 4, 1992, the Supreme Soviet of the Russian Federation adopted the Law on the Education of the Ingush Republic. The creation of the republic was submitted for approval by the supreme authority of Russia – the Congress of People's Deputies. On December 10, 1992, the Congress of People's Deputies of Russia approved the formation of the Ingush Republic by its resolution and made a corresponding amendment to the Constitution of the RSFSR 1978, which officially divided the Chechen-Ingush Republic into the Ingush Republic and the Chechen Republic. This amendment was published on December 29, 1992 in the "Rossiyskaya Gazeta" and entered into force on January 9, 1993 after 10 days from the date of official publication.

Demographics
Vital statistics

Source: Russian Federal State Statistics Service

Ethnic groups

 Combined results of Chechnya and Ingushetia

See also
History of Chechnya
List of leaders of Communist Chechnya
Chechen-Ingush Regional Committee of the Communist Party of the Soviet Union

Notes

References

Bibliography 
 

Autonomous republics of the Russian Soviet Federative Socialist Republic
Politics of Chechnya
History of Chechnya
Politics of Ingushetia
History of Ingushetia
States and territories established in 1936
1936 establishments in the Soviet Union
1991 disestablishments in the Soviet Union
Former socialist republics